The Co-Cathedral of Our Lady of Sorrows is the main Roman Catholic church of the town of Poprad, Slovakia.

History
It was built between 1939 and 1942. The church is 48 m long and 22 m wide. The title "concathedral" refers to the fact that it is the second cathedral in the Diocese of Spiš, after St. Martin's Cathedral in Spišská Kapitula.

References

Roman Catholic cathedrals in Slovakia
20th-century Roman Catholic church buildings in Slovakia
Churches in Prešov Region